Alba: A Wildlife Adventure is an open world adventure game developed by Ustwo Games. The game focuses on exploring the world and conserving wildlife. The game was released on December 11, 2020 for iOS, macOS through Apple Arcade exclusive and Microsoft Windows, and for Nintendo Switch, PlayStation 4, PlayStation 5, Xbox One and Xbox Series X/S on June 9, 2021.

Synopsis
The game takes place at Secarral, a fictional island town in Valencian Community, Spain. The protagonist, a girl named Alba Singh, flies from Great Britain to visit her grandparents for a week-long vacation. After helping to rescue a stranded dolphin, she and her friend Inés form a wildlife rescue league. The next day the mayor announces that the local nature reserve, which suffered from a wildfire, will be developed into a luxury hotel. The girls decide to collect signatures to stop this. They help with multiple cleanups and animal rescue tasks, as well as photographing and cataloging the local wildlife to raise awareness. One of the ultimate goals is to discover an elusive Iberian lynx.

Reception 

It received positive reviews from critics, who praised the open world and the visual style of the game. The game has a score of 79 on Metacritic.

Christian Donlan of Eurogamer praised the realism present in the game's environments, writing "All these animals are a delight when they're knocking about, and when you find them flapping in oil or trapped in the shrink-wrap handcuffs from an idle six-pack, it's impossible not to leap in and help them immediately." Donlan also enjoyed the island setting of Pinar del Mar, calling it "the Spanish holiday island of everyone's dreams: small enough to come to inhabit in the mind, but varied, with a church, an old fort, farmland, lakes... I have been to places like this and I recognise it with real pleasure. The details are beautifully observed, right down to the rebar poking out of the second storey concrete pillars of half-completed houses, right down to the plastic tables around the ice cream place."

Game Informers Marcus Stewart liked the photography mechanic of Alba, although he expressed disappointment at the lack of variety among animals. "Alba taps into the Pokémon Snap-like excitement of hunting down a critter, lining up that perfect shot, and filling out her wildlife journal. I found myself anxious to photograph every creature...My excitement dulled over time, however, because so many of the animals were birds." He also appreciated the straightforward side quests on the island, "These uncomplicated tasks range from finding a lost dog to convincing a woman to sample the latest ice cream flavor. That simplicity might be an indictment in other games, but Alba’s breezy atmosphere makes cruising through the fluff more relaxing than boring."

Jupiter Hadley, writing for Pocket Gamer, enjoyed how the player's actions had an impact on the island, "All of your actions have direct results - the bird feeders then sparkle, adding birds to the area. The trash goes into the bin, making your character happy and bringing new animals to the island." Hadley praised the game for having a good message about advocating for a cause, "Alba: A Wildlife Adventure shows the power of a little girl and what she can do... it feels like the world is actually becoming better through small actions that you could do in the real world today. It’s a good game to give to children, to help pass along the idea that they can make a difference, they can help the world".

The game won Apple Design Awards in 2021 in Social Impact category.

References

External links 
 

2020 video games
Adventure games
Apple Arcade games
iOS games
MacOS games
Nintendo Switch games
Open-world video games
PlayStation 4 games
PlayStation 5 games
Single-player video games
Video games about animals
Video games developed in the United Kingdom
Windows games
Xbox One games
Xbox Series X and Series S games
Ustwo games